Artemas Ward (May 28, 1848 – March 14, 1925) was an American author and advertising executive. He is known for authoring several biographies as well as The Grocer's Encyclopedia.

Biography

Ward, born May 28, 1848, was the great-grandson and namesake of Artemas Ward, a major general during the American Revolutionary War.

Ward's first position was in 1863 with the New York State Soldiers’ Depot. Later, Ward moved to Philadelphia, entering the Cuban export and import business, and next founded and published the Philadelphia Grocer. This led to an offer to manage advertising for household cleaner Sapolio Soap. He introduced the use of transit ads for Sapolio in almost all public transit vehicles in the country. He later obtained an exclusive franchise for the advertising facilities on New York City’s elevated railway and subway systems.

He was inducted into the Advertising Hall of Fame in 1975.

References
Artemas Ward via AAF Hall of Fame
Artemas Ward biography via Feeding America
Staff report (March 15, 1925). ARTEMAS WARD DIES IN CITY HOME AT 76; Head of Advertising Firm Was Kin of Gen. Artemas Ward of the Revolution. COLLECTOR OF AMERICANA He Was President of Several Corporations and Founder of Hospital of Hope for Crippled Men. The New York Times

1848 births
1925 deaths
American biographers